This is a list of things named for the German scientist Max Planck:

Physics
Boltzmann–Planck equation
Fokker–Planck equation
Nernst–Planck equation
Kelvin–Planck statement of the second law of thermodynamics 
Massieu–Planck potentials
Planck potential 
Planck proposition, Planck statement, Planck's principle; see Kelvin–Planck statement
Planckian locus

Quantum mechanics
Planck constant
Planck postulate
Planck's law of black body radiation
Planck–Einstein relation

Cosmology
Planck units
Planck energy
Planck length
Planck mass
Planck time
Planck temperature
Planck epoch
Planck postulate
Planck scale
Planck star
Trans-Planckian problem

Other 
 1069 Planckia, asteroid
 Max Planck Society
 Planck's principle
 Planck (crater) on the Moon
 Planck (spacecraft), space observatory
 Max-Planck-Gesellschaft, see Max Planck Society
 Colegio Max Planck, in Trujillo, Peru.

Planck
Planck
Named after